St Andrew's Parish Church is a congregation of the Church of Scotland located in Arbroath, Angus, Scotland.

The church building was constructed in the late 1880s. In 2007 the church underwent extensive refurbishment, funded by donations from the congregation and a grant from the Church of Scotland. The current minister is the Rev. Martin Fair. The church houses the 7th Arbroath Boys' Brigade and other youth groups.

See also
Church of St Mary the Virgin, Arbroath (Episcopal)
St John's Methodist Church, Arbroath

References

External links
 Parish website

Arbroath
Churches in Angus, Scotland
1880s establishments in Scotland
Arbroath